For the Love of Strange Medicine is the second solo studio album by Steve Perry, released on July 13, 1994 through Columbia Records. The album came after a lengthy 8-year hiatus following the breakup of Journey.  The first single "You Better Wait" received radio airplay, reaching the top 10 on the Billboard Mainstream Rock chart and peaking at #29 on the Billboard Hot 100. The album was certified gold by the RIAA in September 1994 and followed by a tour from 1994-95.

The song "Young Hearts Forever" was written by Perry as a tribute to his late friend, Thin Lizzy frontman Phil Lynott, who died in 1986.

Background 
Journey released their ninth studio album Raised on Radio in 1986, which was Steve Perry's sixth album as lead singer. The band subsequently went on a hiatus in 1987. After the split, Perry "didn't feel the passion" for writing and recording music, but eventually began writing songs for the album with musicians Lincoln Brewster, Paul Taylor, and Moyes Lucas.

Track listing 

Notes (2006 re-release)
"If You Need Me, Call Me" is a 1994 re-recording of a song of Perry's pre-Journey band, Alien Project.
"One More Time" is an unreleased out take from 1994.
"Can't Stop" and "Friends of Mine" are previously unreleased tracks from the 1988 unreleased Against the Wall album.

Personnel
 Steve Perry – lead and backing vocals
 Paul Taylor – keyboards (1-8, 10), backing vocals (1), synthesizers (11)
 Tim Miner – keyboards (9), acoustic piano (9, 11), bass (9, 11), backing vocals (9, 11)
 Lincoln Brewster –  guitars (1-8), backing vocals (1)
 Michael Landau – guitars (11)
 Larry Kimpel – bass (1, 2, 4, 10)
 Mike Porcaro – bass (2, 3, 5, 6, 7)
 Moyes Lucas – drums (1, 4-8, 10), backing vocals (1)
 Jeremy Lubbock – string arrangements and conductor (3)
 James "Jimbo" Barton – string arrangements (3)
 Phil Brown – string arrangements (3), bass (8)
 Larry Dalton – string arrangements and conductor (9)
 Dallas Symphony Orchestra – strings (9)
 Alexander Brown – backing vocals (4, 10)
 Carmen Carter – backing vocals (4, 10)
 Jean McClain – backing vocals (4, 10)

Production
 Producers – James "Jimbo" Barton (Tracks 1-8 & 10); Steve Perry (Tracks 5, 6, 9 & 11); Tim Miner (Tracks 9 & 11).
 Production Assistant on Tracks 1-4, 7, 8 & 10 – Phil Brown.
 Engineers – James "Jimbo" Barton (Tracks 1-8 & 10); Tim Kimsey and Frank Salazar (Track 9); Craig Burbidge (Track 11).
 Assistant and Second Engineers – Bill Cooper, Devin Foutz, Manny Marroquin, Christopher C. Murphy, Kyle Ross, Rail Jon Rogut and Ulrich Wild.
 Mixing – Niko Bolas (Tracks 1, 2 & 6); Craig Burbidge (Tracks 3, 4, 5 & 7-11).
 Recorded at Ocean Way Recording and One On One Studios (Hollywood, California); Record Plant (Los Angeles, California); The Enterprise (Burbank, California); American Recording Studios (Woodland Hills, California); Knightlight Studios and Dallas Sound Lab (Dallas, Texas).
 Digital Editing – Brian Lee
 Mastered by Bob Ludwig at Gateway Mastering (Portland, Maine).

Charts

Album

References

1994 albums
Steve Perry albums
Albums produced by James Barton (producer)
Columbia Records albums